William Orgain Allen (William Orgain; 1829–1875). At age two, he inherited the  Claremont Estate on the James River in Virginia from his granduncle Colonel William Allen (1768–1831). To satisfy the terms of his inheritance, his name was officially changed to William Allen in 1832.

At the time of his death, newspaper obituaries reported that prior to the Civil War Allen was the wealthiest man in Virginia and one of the wealthiest in the South. His property included Jamestown Island, vast plantations in three Virginia counties, lumber and shipping businesses, and a railroad. Initially a major supporter of the Confederacy, Allen resigned his military post in 1862, claiming to have already lost $450,000 in goods and material donated to the Confederate cause, as well as plantation property damaged by looters and occupying Union forces.

References
 Gregory, Eve S., Claremont Manor: A History, 1990.

External links 
 Claremont Manor: A History web site

1829 births
1875 deaths
19th-century American landowners
People from Virginia
19th-century American businesspeople